"Love Remains the Same" is a song by British artist Gavin Rossdale. It was released in May 2008 as the lead single from his album Wanderlust. It entered the Billboard Hot 100 at number 76 and peaked at number 27. It unexpectedly became Rossdale's first top-40 hit in the United States since 1995 when his former band Bush scored hits with "Comedown" and "Glycerine". It has since become more successful than Rossdale's biggest hits with Bush from the mid-1990s and is now his most successful track.

Track list
CD German single (0602517733183)

 "Love Remains the Same"
 "Jungle in the Circus"
 "Vaya Con Dios"
 "Love Remains the Same" (video)

Charts

Weekly charts

Year-end charts

External links 
 Gavin Rossdale Official Site
 Gavin Rossdale Fansite

References 

2008 singles
Songs written by Gavin Rossdale
Songs written by Marti Frederiksen
2008 songs
Interscope Records singles
Song recordings produced by Bob Rock